Samuel Cony (February 27, 1811 – October 5, 1870) was an American politician, who most notably served as the 31st Governor of Maine from 1864 to 1867.

Early years 
Cony was born in Augusta (in modern-day Maine, then a part of Massachusetts) on February 27, 1811, the son of Susan Bowdoin (Coney) and Samuel Cony. He studied at the China Academy and Wakefield College. He graduated from Brown University in 1829. He then studied law with future U.S. Congressman Hiram Belcher, of Farmington and also with his uncle, future U.S. Senator Reuel Williams of Augusta.

Career in law 
Cony was admitted to the bar in 1832. He opened an office in Old Town, Maine. He served as a judge of the Probate Court for Penobscot County, Maine from 1840 to 1846.

Early political career
Cony was originally a Democrat and served as a member of the Maine House of Representatives from 1835 to 1836 from Penobscot County. He also served as a member of the governor's executive council (1839), the land agent for Maine (1847–1850). In 1850 he left Old Town for Augusta when he was appointed state treasurer of Maine (1850–1854). He subsequently became mayor of Augusta (1854). He joined the Republican Party in 1862, which had then become ascendant in Maine politics. He was re-elected to the Maine House of Representatives, now representing a district in Kennebec County, and served for one term.

Governor of Maine 
Cony was nominated by the Maine Republican Party as their candidate for governor and was elected governor by a popular vote in 1863. He was elected governor three times. During his administration, troops and provisions continued to be raised for the American Civil War. Maine sent more than 70,000 men to the front. The Executive of the State issued 4,295 commissions, of which Cony signed about 1,400. Cony announced that he would not accept another nomination in his inaugural address at the opening of the legislature in January 1866. He left office on January 2, 1867.

Personal life 
Cony married twice. He married Mercy H. Sewall on October 17, 1833. She died April 9, 1847. He then married Lucy W. Brooks on November 22, 1849. He had six children. He was a Congregationalist. His home on Stone Street in Augusta, the Gov. Samuel Cony House, has been listed on the National Register of Historic Places since 1985.

References

Sources 
 Sobel, Robert and John Raimo. Biographical Directory of the Governors of the United States, 1789-1978. Greenwood Press, 1988. 
 

1811 births
1870 deaths
People from Old Town, Maine
Governors of Maine
Mayors of Augusta, Maine
Maine Republicans
State treasurers of Maine
Members of the Maine House of Representatives
Maine Democrats
Members of the Executive Council of Maine
Union (American Civil War) state governors
American Congregationalists
Brown University alumni
Republican Party governors of Maine
19th-century American politicians